The pygmy cuckooshrike (Celebesica abbotti) is a species of bird in the cuckooshrike family Campephagidae. It is endemic to the Indonesian island of Sulawesi. Its natural habitat is subtropical or tropical moist montane forests.

This species was formerly placed in the genus Coracina. A molecular phylogenetic study published in 2010 found the genus Coracina was non-monophyletic. In the resulting reorganization to create monophyletic genera, the pygmy cuckooshrike is the only species placed in the resurrected genus Celebesica.

References

pygmy cuckooshrike
Endemic birds of Sulawesi
pygmy cuckooshrike
pygmy cuckooshrike
Taxonomy articles created by Polbot